The World Scout Foundation (WSF) is an international, non-profit institution based in Geneva, Switzerland. Its mission is to develop World Scouting by the provision of financial and other support through the World Organization of the Scout Movement (WOSM). Scouting is a pastime for young people typically organized in local units that emphasizes outdoor activities, self-discipline and civic engagement.

The WSF was founded in 1969 but reorganized in the current form in 1977. The Honorary President is HM Carl XVI Gustaf, King of Sweden who actively participates in the activities of the foundation. The organisation is headed by Chairman Hector Robledo Cervantes and Director John Geoghegan.

The WSF is permanently investing capital donations from individuals, foundations, corporations, governments and from members of the Scout Movement. Nearly all of the earned profit from investments is  donated to the WOSM. The Foundation also seeks non-capital donations to support specific World Scouting projects, such as the Gifts of Peace project.

World Baden-Powell Fellowship 

The Fellowship provides a lifetime association with the Scout Movement and with businesses, governments and Scouting leaders who share the same ideals. 
The World BP Fellowship recognises different levels of donation beginning at USD 10,000 for adults and USD 1000 for young members.

Honours Programme
All gifts to the Foundation are counted towards achieving the six Circles of the Honours Programme. These include contributions made to the World Baden-Powell Fellowship, the Royal Birthday Appeal, the Queen Silvia Fund and the Scout Donation Platform. Those who make a financial commitment to Scouting in their Last Will and Testament are also recognised in “The Founder’s Heritage”.

The Honours Programme recognizes those who have attained higher levels of financial support to the World Scout Foundation.
 The Benefactors' Circle honours those who have made gifts totaling US$25,000.
 The International Circle honours those who have made gifts totaling US$50,000. 
 The Chairman's Circle honours those who have made gifts totaling US$100,000. 
 The Regal Circle honours those who have made gifts totaling US$1 million.

Recognition for attainment of these Circles of Membership is given on a special occasion, usually by the Honorary Chairman of the World Scout Foundation.

Queen Silvia Fund
The Queen Silvia Fund is an endowment that enables young disabled people, worldwide, to benefit through Scouting. It was created as a lasting gift to commemorate the 50th birthday celebration of Queen Silvia of Sweden. The fund's slogan is "There can be no task nobler than giving every child a better future."

The initial gifts of over US$100,000 came from members of the World Scout Foundation's Baden-Powell Fellowship. Since then the endowment has grown to a quarter of million dollars, and the fund continuously solicits more donations. The queen personally approves each project grant.

See also 

Messengers of Peace (Scouting)

Notes

External links
 World Scout Foundation

World Organization of the Scout Movement
Organizations established in 1969
1969 establishments in Switzerland